David Graeber was an American anthropologist and social theorist. Unless otherwise noted, all works are authored solely by David Graeber.

Books 
 
 
 
 
 
 
 
 
 
 
 
 Written with David Wengrow.

Posthumous books and unfinished books
 Conversations with Mehdi Belhaj Kacem, Nika Dubrovsky, and Assia Turquier-Zauberman.
 Written with Nika Dubrovsky.

 Coedited by Romy Ruukel.
 Coedited by Setsuko Nakayama.

Edited books

Academic articles

Journalism and popular articles
 
 
  (originally delivered as a keynote address during the "History Matters: Social Movements Past, Present, and Future" conference at the New School for Social Research on May 3, 2003)
  Co-authored with Andrej Grubacic
  (originally an address to Anthropology, Art and Activism Seminar Series at Brown University's Watson Institute, December 6, 2005)
 
 
 
 
 
 
 
 
 
   
   
   
 
   
 
  
 
 
 
 
 
  
 
 
  
  
  
  
  A conversation between David Graeber and Thomas Piketty.
 
 
  
  
  
 
  
  
  
  
  Co-authored with David Wengrow.
  
  
  : review of  Opening of David Graeber's review (p. 52): "There is a growing feeling, among those who have the responsibility of managing large economies, that the discipline of economics is no longer fit for purpose. It is beginning to look like a science designed to solve problems that no longer exist."

References 

Graeber, David